Acorypha is a genus of grasshoppers belonging to the family Acrididae.

The species of this genus are found in Africa, the Middle East and Asia.

Species
The Orthoptera species file includes:
 Acorypha bimaculata (Krauss, 1902)
 Acorypha brazzavillei (Sjöstedt, 1931)
 Acorypha clara (Walker, 1870)
 Acorypha concisa (Walker, 1870)
 Acorypha corallipes Sjöstedt, 1931
 Acorypha decisa (Walker, 1870)
 Acorypha dipelecia Jago, 1966
 Acorypha divisa (Uvarov, 1950)
 Acorypha ferrifer (Walker, 1870)
 Acorypha glaucopsis (Walker, 1870)
 Acorypha hemiptera (Uvarov, 1950)
 Acorypha insignis (Walker, 1870)
 Acorypha johnstoni (Kirby, 1902)
 Acorypha karschi (Martínez y Fernández-Castillo, 1902)
 Acorypha laticosta (Karsch, 1896)
 Acorypha macracantha (Martínez y Fernández-Castillo, 1898)
 Acorypha modesta Uvarov, 1950
 Acorypha nigrovariegata (Bolívar, 1889)
 Acorypha nodula (Giglio-Tos, 1907)
 Acorypha onerosa (Uvarov, 1950)
 Acorypha ornatipes Uvarov, 1950
 Acorypha pallidicornis (Stål, 1876)
 Acorypha picta Krauss, 1877 - type species
 Acorypha pipinna Jago, 1967
 Acorypha pulla (Uvarov, 1950)
 Acorypha recta Uvarov, 1950
 Acorypha reducta (Kevan, 1967)
 Acorypha saddiensis Kevan, 1967
 Acorypha saussurei (Martínez y Fernández-Castillo, 1896)
 Acorypha signata (Walker, 1870)
 Acorypha unicarinata (Krauss, 1877)
 Acorypha vittata (Bolívar, 1889)

References

Acrididae
Caelifera genera